The 2012–13 Southern Professional Hockey League season was the ninth season of the Southern Professional Hockey League (SPHL).  The regular season began October 26, 2012 and ended April 14, 2013, after a 56-game regular season and an 8-team playoff.  The Fayetteville FireAntz captured their first SPHL regular season title. The Pensacola Ice Flyers defeated the Huntsville Havoc in the President's Cup final 2 games to 1 to win the team's first President's Cup.

Regular season

Final standings

‡  William B. Coffey Trophy winners
 Advanced to playoffs

Attendance

President's Cup playoffs

* indicates overtime period.

Finals
All times are local (EDT/CDT)

Awards
The SPHL All-Rookie team was announced on March 27, 2013, the All-SPHL teams on March 28, Defenseman of the Year on March 29, Rookie of the Year on April 1, Goaltender of the Year on April 2, Coach of the Year on April 3, and Most Valuable Player on April 4.

All-SPHL selections

References

Southern Professional Hockey League seasons
South